The pointed-headed caecilian (Ichthyophis acuminatus) is a species of amphibian in the family Ichthyophiidae endemic to Thailand. Its natural habitats are subtropical or tropical moist lowland forests, subtropical or tropical moist montane forests, rivers, intermittent rivers, plantations, rural gardens, heavily degraded former forest, irrigated land, and seasonally flooded agricultural land.

References

acuminatus
Amphibians described in 1960
Amphibians of Thailand
Taxonomy articles created by Polbot